is the fifth-largest beer brewery in Japan, headquartered in Urasoe, Okinawa Prefecture. The company commands approximately 1% of the Japanese beer market, and controls 60% of the beer market on Okinawa.

History
Founded in 1957 in Nago, Okinawa during the American occupation of Okinawa, Orion began making beer in 1959. Orion struggled to compete with the other major Japanese breweries, but after changing from a German-style beer to an American-style beer, it gained the top share in the Okinawan market. Up until 2002, it had a market that was limited to mostly Okinawa. Since 2002, Orion partnered with Asahi Breweries to manufacture Asahi beers in Okinawa, in return for Asahi's assistance in selling Orion beer outside of Okinawa. Asahi owns 10% of Orion Breweries.

In January 2019, Nomura Holdings and The Carlyle Group entered talks to acquire Orion Breweries and help the beer brand expand in the USA and in Asia. On May 14, 2019, Orion entered the chūhai market with the release of the WATTA chūhai brand, using traditional Okinawan flavors. In July 2019, Keiju Hayase was appointed President and CEO of Orion Breweries.

In 2020, Orion Breweries stopped the production and distribution of its 9% ABV beer, Watta Strong, in a move to fight alcoholism, the first major brewery in Japan to make a move in this direction.

Description
Orion uses water that comes from springs out of the mountain near the brewery. The brewery imports its malt from Germany, and also uses German Hallertau and Czech Saaz hops. The brand is known by the US military personnel stationed in Okinawa. The company's sales outside of Japan make up 5% of its sales. In 2017, Orion Breweries recorded sales of 28.3 billion yen.

In Korea, Orion beer is marketed under the brand name Okinawa.

Orion beer sponsors the Okinawan wrestler Menso-re Oyaji. Akihito Yagi, 8th Dan in Meibukan Goju Ryu Karate-do, which his late grandfather (Meitoku Yagi) created, and who is the current chairman of the International Meibukan Goju Ryu Karate Association (IMGKA), is a spokesman for Orion beer.

In popular culture
In one episode of Wakakozake, the main character Wakako tries out different restaurants to pair foods with drinks, and pairs goya chanpuru with Orion beer.

References

External links

 Orion official site 
 Orion official site 

Beer in Japan
Companies based in Okinawa Prefecture
Japanese brands
Food and drink companies established in 1957
Japanese companies established in 1957